Ľubomír Mick (born 17 May 1978 in Poprad) is a Slovakian luger who competed from 1993 to 2006. Competing in two Winter Olympics, he earned his best finish of ninth in the men's doubles event at Salt Lake City in 2002.

Mick's best finish at the FIL World Luge Championships was seventh in the men's doubles event at Park City, Utah in 2005.

References
 }
 Lugesport.com profile 
 SSSR profile of the luge team, including Mick 
 
 2002 luge men's singles results
 2002 luge men's doubles results
 2006 luge men's doubles results

External links
 

1978 births
Living people
Slovak male lugers
Olympic lugers of Slovakia
Lugers at the 2002 Winter Olympics
Lugers at the 2006 Winter Olympics
Sportspeople from Poprad